Dharmendra Pradhan (born 26 June 1969) is an Indian politician serving as the Minister of Education and Minister of Skill Development and Entrepreneurship in the Government of India. He has also been the Minister of Petroleum & Natural Gas and Minister of Steel.

Pradhan was promoted to a Cabinet Minister on 3 September 2017. Shri Pradhan currently represents Madhya Pradesh in the Rajya Sabha as Member of Parliament. Earlier, he was a member of the 14th Lok Sabha.

Early life and politics
He is the son of Debendra Pradhan, who was also a Minister of  State in the Vajpayee government from 1999-2004. Born on 26 June 1969, into the Khandayat Kurmi caste in Odisha state, he hails from the city of Talcher.

He became an A.B.V.P. activist while studying as a higher secondary student in Talcher College (Orissa) and later became the president of student union of Talcher College. Pradhan started his political career as an Akhil Bhartiya Vidyarthi Parishad (ABVP) activist in 1983 and was elected as its secretary. He holds a post-graduate degree in Anthropology from Utkal University in Bhubaneswar.

After serving in different positions in the BJP, he was elected to the Lok Sabha in 2004 from Deogarh. He was also elected the member of the Rajya Sabha for two terms each from Bihar and Madhya Pradesh.

Union minister

Union Minister for Petroleum and Natural Gas
Dharmendra Pradhan has been the longest serving Minister for Petroleum and Natural Gas in the history of independent India. Joining as the Minister of State (In-charge) in 2014, he was later promoted to the Cabinet rank in 2017. On 31 May 2019, Shri Pradhan began his second consecutive tenure at the Ministry of Petroleum & Natural Gas, Government of India.

The Ujjwala Man
Popularly called the "Ujjwala Man", Pradhan is credited with the success of Pradhan Mantri Ujjwala Yojana launched by the Ministry of Petroleum & Natural Gas under which over 8 million LPG connections have been provided to women from Below Poverty Line (BPL) families over the past 6 years. Ujjwala Yojana has been hailed as the vehicle for driving women empowerment and social change. International Energy Agency termed Ujjwala Yojana as a "game-changer in ending energy poverty". IIM Ahmedabad published a working paper on "Lighting up Lives through Cooking Gas and transforming society". PM Ujjwala Yojana, among other initiatives is also considered one of the key factors behind the re-election of the Modi Government in 2019 Lok Sabha election.

Policy reforms
Pradhan has led some key decisions in the hydrocarbon sector. Pradhan, supported by the Union Cabinet, has brought in a new Hydrocarbon Exploration & Licensing Policy, which through its uniform licensing for explorations and production of all forms of hydrocarbon, open acreage policy and marketing and pricing freedom will enhance domestic oil & gas production with substantial investment in the sector in India and generate sizable employment. He also led consumer initiatives like PAHAL which is the world's largest Direct Benefit Transfer Scheme and the Give It Up campaign, that was liberally supported by the Prime Minister Shri Narendra Modi, aimed at encouraging affluent citizens to surrender their LPG subsidy for the needy receiving a successful response of 10 million consumers.

Energy transition
Dharmendra Pradhan, as the Petroleum Minister has been driving India's energy transition balancing India's energy demand and India's commitment to climate change mitigation efforts. He has provided leadership to efforts around making India, a gas-based economy. With around $60 billion of investments lined up in India's gas infrastructure, Pradhan has been working to expand the city gas distribution network and piped gas network in the country. He has underlined that India is going to chart its own path of energy transition which will balance India's energy demand and decarbonisation efforts.

Union Minister of Steel
In a brief tenure as the Minister of Steel, Dharmendra Pradhan has been working to facilitate augmentation of production capacity, ensure growth of secondary steel sector, jobs creation, ensures value addition and import substitution. With particular focus on enhancing steel usage in India, he launched Ispati Irada, a collaborative campaign to involve all stakeholders in this drive. He also launched Mission Purvodaya in steel sector to drive transformation of eastern India through the growth of steel industry which has majority presence in eastern India.

Union Minister of Skill Development
As Minister of Skill Development and Entrepreneurship, Pradhan launched many key initiatives focussing on reskilling and upskilling the manpower of India and focusing on bridging the skill gap for the Indian youth.  During his tenure, the total number of Industrial Training Institutes (ITIs) increased by over 40% and student enrolment increased by over 28% till 2019. He brought in new paradigms in the regulatory environment by mooting National Council for Vocational Education and Training (NCVET) as new unified national reg IBM, Adobe etc. to introduce new age skills related to Industry 4.0. He also launched one of the world's largest counselling programs named Skill Saathi.

In May 2019, Pradhan continued his Ministry of Petroleum and Natural Gas and got the Ministry of Steel.

Union Minister of Education

In July 2021, Pradhan became Minister of Education in Second Modi ministry after the Cabinet reshuffle replacing Ramesh Pokhriyal.

Positions held
 In-charge - BJP Uttar Pradesh
Minister of Education, Skill Development & Entrepreneurship (Jul 2021 – Present)
Minister of Petroleum & Natural Gas, Steel (May 2019 - Jul 2021)
Minister of Petroleum & Natural Gas, Skill Development & Entrepreneurship (Sept 2017 - May 2019)
Minister of State (Independent Charge) : Petroleum & Natural Gas (May 2014 - Sept 2017)
 Member of Parliament (Rajya Sabha), Madhya Pradesh (MP): April 2018 in BJP – present
 Member of Parliament (Rajya Sabha), Bihar: 2012– 2018
 In-charge BJP Karnataka: 2011–2013
Bharatiya Janata Party All India General Secretary - 2010 - 2015
 Co-Incharge - BJP Bihar:  - State Elections
 In-charge Bharatiya Janta Yuva Morcha (BJYM): 
 In-Charge BJP Jharkhand: 
 Election in Charge BJP Uttarakhand
 Bharatiya Janata Party: National Secretary 2007–2010
 In-charge Chhattisgarh: 2007–2010
 Member of Parliament (Lok Sabha): 2004–2009 Deogarh, Odisha, India
 Bharatiya Janata Yuva Morcha National President: 2004–2006
 Member of Odisha Legislative Assembly 2000–2004 Pallahada Assembly constituency
 National Secretary of ABVP 1995
 President, Talcher College Students' Union 1985
 Started as an Akhil Bhartiya Vidyarthi Parishad (ABVP) activist in the year 1983

References

External links
Official Video Channel of Dharmendra Pradhan Ji on Veblr.com

|-

|-

|-

|-

|-

|-

1969 births
Living people
People from Odisha
Bharatiya Janata Party politicians from Odisha
India MPs 2004–2009
People from Angul district
Rajya Sabha members from Bihar
Lok Sabha members from Odisha
Narendra Modi ministry
People from Debagarh district
Members of the Cabinet of India
Steel Ministers of India
Petroleum and Natural Gas Ministers of India
Education Ministers of India